Radziejowski is a surname. Notable people with the surname include:

Hieronim Radziejowski (1612–1667), exile who led the Swedish to Poland
Lucyna Radziejowska (1899–1944), Polish teacher known for lending aid to Jews during World War II
Michał Stefan Radziejowski (1645–1705), cardinal
Stanisław Radziejowski (1575–1637), politician

See also
Radziejów County (Polish: powiat radziejowski)